Hauya elegans is a species of flowering plant in the Onagraceae family. It is native to Oaxaca and Chiapas, Mexico to Honduras, Costa Rica, and Guatemala.

References

External links
 
 

elegans
Plants described in 1828
Flora of Mexico
Taxa named by Martín Sessé y Lacasta
Taxa named by Alphonse Pyramus de Candolle
Taxa named by José Mariano Mociño